HD 68988 is a star in the northern constellation of Ursa Major. It has been given the proper name Násti, which means star in the Northern Sami language. The name was selected in the NameExoWorlds campaign by Norway, during the 100th anniversary of the IAU. HD 68988 is too faint to be seen with the naked eye, having an apparent visual magnitude of 8.20. The star is located at a distance of 199 light years from the Sun based on parallax.

The stellar classification of HD 68988 has been given as G0V, G2V, and G2IV. The age of this star was estimated as six billion years in 2002, but was later revised down to one billion years in 2015. It is rotating slowly and is chromospherically inactive. The star has 16% more mass than the Sun and an 8% greater radius with a high metallicity; what astronomers term the abundance of heavier elements. It is radiating 1.3 times the luminosity of the Sun from its photosphere at an effective temperature of 5,919 K.

Planetary system
There are two exoplanet: HD 68988 b was discovered in 2002  and HD 68988 c was discovered in 2006. The orbit of the inner exoplanet is surprisingly eccentric for such a close in orbit, and over time it may become circularized, although orbital parameters were significantly revised in 2021, resulting in wider orbit.

See also
 List of extrasolar planets

References

External links
 


G-type main-sequence stars
Planetary systems with two confirmed planets
Ursa Major (constellation)
Durchmusterung objects
068988
040867